CBC Television is a Canadian English language public television network made up of fourteen owned-and-operated stations. Some privately owned stations were formerly affiliated with the network until as late as August 2016. This is a table listing of CBC Television's stations, arranged by market. This article also includes former self-supporting stations later operating as rebroadcasters of regional affiliates, stations no longer affiliated with CBC Television, and stations purchased by the CBC that formerly operated as private CBC Television affiliates.

The station's virtual channel number (if applicable) follows the call letters. The number in parentheses that follows is the station's actual digital channel number; digital channels allocated for future use listed in parentheses are italicized.

CBC Television's O&Os operate for the most part as a seamless national service, with few deviations from the national schedule. The network's former private affiliates had some flexibility to carry a reduced schedule of network programming if they chose.

Over the years the CBC has gradually reduced the number of private affiliates; until 2006 this usually involved either opening a new station (or new rebroadcast transmitters) in a market previously served by a private affiliate, or purchasing the affiliate outright. In most cases since 2006 (when CFJC-TV disaffiliated), it declined to open new rebroadcasters in the affected markets for budgetary reasons, and since then has wound down its remaining affiliation agreements, with the last expiring on August 31, 2016. These disaffiliations, along with the CBC's decision to shut down its TV rebroadcaster network in 2012, have significantly reduced the network's terrestrial coverage; however, under Canadian Radio-television and Telecommunications Commission (CRTC) regulations, all cable, satellite, and IPTV service providers are required to include a CBC Television signal in their basic service, even if one is not available terrestrially in the applicable service area.

Since September 2014, all CBC Television O&Os have also been separately affiliated with the temporary and (since April 2015) permanent part-time networks operated by Rogers Media for the purposes of distributing the Rogers-produced Hockey Night in Canada broadcasts. This was required by the CRTC as, under the current arrangement for National Hockey League rights between Rogers and the CBC, Rogers exercises editorial control and sells all advertising time during the HNIC broadcasts, even though for promotional purposes they are still treated as part of the CBC Television schedule. Although the CRTC decision which approved the permanent network only referred to stations owned by the CBC itself, CBC Television's private affiliates also continued to carry the Rogers-produced HNIC broadcasts until disaffiliation.

See also
List of Ici Radio-Canada Télé television stations for stations affiliated with or owned by the CBC's French-language television network Ici Radio-Canada Télé
List of assets owned by Canadian Broadcasting Corporation
List of defunct CBC and Radio-Canada television transmitters - decommissioned on July 31, 2012
CBUVT, a licensed but unbuilt CBC Television station in Victoria, British Columbia

Notes
 Two boldface asterisks appearing following a station's call letters (**) indicate a station that was built and signed on by the Canadian Broadcasting Corporation
 Italicized channel numbers indicate a digital channel allocated for future use by the Canadian Radio-television and Telecommunications Commission.

CBC owned-and-operated stations

Former CBC-owned self-supporting stations

Former affiliates

1 - CHEK-TV carried an official secondary affiliation with CTV alongside CBC from 1963 until 1981.

Affiliates later purchased by the CBC

References